Soh (also known as Sō and Sūh) is a village in Murcheh Khvort Rural District, in the Central District of Shahin Shahr and Meymeh County, Isfahan Province, Iran. At the 2006 census, its population was 403, in 141 families.

References 

Populated places in Shahin Shahr and Meymeh County